Ulieș is a commune in Harghita County, Romania. It lies in the Székely Land, an ethno-cultural region in eastern Transylvania.

Component villages 
The commune is composed of eight villages:

Demographics
The commune has an absolute Székely Hungarian majority. According to the 2002 census it has a population of 1,273 of which 98.59% or 1,255 are Hungarian.

References

Communes in Harghita County
Localities in Transylvania
Székely communities